Alanís is a municipality in Seville. In 2005 it had a population of 1,937. It has an area of 280 square kilometers and a population density of 6.9 people per square kilometer. It is located at an altitude of 660 meters and is 106 kilometers from Seville.

Demographics
The population has been steadily decreasing from 2,108 in 1996 to its current level.

Monuments
Alanís has several monuments.

Religious monuments
Ermita de San Juan. (S XIV), mudejar. Recently restored.
Ermita Nuestra Señora de las Angustias. Gothic. Remade in the 18th century.
Ermita de Ntro Padre Jesus de Nazareno. From the 16th century. Can be visited from 10 AM to 10 PM.
Iglesia Parroquial Ntra Sra de las Nieves. Important Gothic altarpiece.
Ermita de San Miguel de la Breña.

Other monuments
Castillo de Alanís, of Arabic origin.

References

Municipalities of the Province of Seville